Bathycongrus is a genus of eels in the family Congridae.

Species
There are currently 22 recognized species in this genus:

 Bathycongrus aequoreus (C. H. Gilbert & Cramer, 1897)
 Bathycongrus bertini (Poll, 1953)
 Bathycongrus bleekeri Fowler, 1934
 Bathycongrus bullisi (D. G. Smith & Kanazawa, 1977) (Bullish Conger)
 Bathycongrus dubius (Breder, 1927) (dubious conger)
 Bathycongrus guttulatus (Günther, 1887) (Lined conger)
 Bathycongrus longicavis Karmovskaya, 2009
 Bathycongrus macrocercus (Alcock, 1894)
 Bathycongrus macrurus (C. H. Gilbert, 1891) (Shorthead conger)
 Bathycongrus nasicus (Alcock, 1894)
 Bathycongrus odontostomus (Fowler, 1934) (Toothy conger)
 Bathycongrus parapolyporus Karmovskaya, 2009
 Bathycongrus parviporus Karmovskaya, 2011
 Bathycongrus polyporus (D. G. Smith & Kanazawa, 1977)
 Bathycongrus retrotinctus (D. S. Jordan & Snyder, 1901) (blackedge conger) (formerly known as Bathycongrus randalli)
 Bathycongrus thysanochilus (Reid, 1934) (Conger eel)
 Bathycongrus trilineatus (Castle, 1964)
 Bathycongrus trimaculatus Karmovskaya & D. G. Smith, 2008
 Bathycongrus unimaculatus Karmovskaya, 2009
 Bathycongrus varidens (Garman, 1899) (Largehead conger)
 Bathycongrus vicinalis (Garman, 1899) (Neighbor conger)
 Bathycongrus wallacei (Castle, 1968) (Longnose conger)

Former Species
Species formerly categorized as Bathycongrus, that are now listed under a different genus
 Bathycongrus mystax - now known as Gnathophis mystax (thinlip conger)

References

 
Congridae